Duff McDonald is a Canadian American business journalist and writer based in New York.

Early life and education
McDonald was born in Toronto.  He attended University of Pennsylvania from 1988 to 1992 and majored in Finance.

Career
His first job after university was at Goldman Sachs. By 2009, he published Last Man Standing: The Ascent of Jamie Dimon and JPMorgan Chase which was a biography on Jamie Dimon. Later, he authored “The Firm: The Story of McKinsey and Its Secret Influence on American Business” which took a critical eye to the role and reputation of McKinsey & Co.

In 2017, he published The Golden Passport which heavily criticized the Harvard Business School.

Awards
2004: Canadian National Magazine Awards for Conrad's Fall
Best Business Story (gold)
Best Investigative Reporting (silver)

Works
  
    (co-written with Owen Burke)
  
 The Golden Passport: Harvard Business School, the Limits of Capitalism, and the Moral Failure of the MBA Elite. Harper Business. 2017.

References

External links

Living people
American business and financial journalists
American male journalists
Canadian male journalists
Canadian male non-fiction writers
University of Pennsylvania alumni
Year of birth missing (living people)